Alessandro Sturba (born 23 February 1972) is a former Italian footballer.

Biography
Born in Rome, Sturba started his professional career at Verona, northern Italy. Sturba made his Serie A debut on 17 November 1991, replaced Claudio Lunini in the 69th minutes. He played the next league match as starter against Torino, which ended in 0–0 draw. He then spent seasons in Serie C1 clubs, which he won the champion in 1997 for Andria. After a Serie B season with Andria, he left for Serie C1 (group A) side Siena. But in mid-season joined Livorno, at that time in the same group. In 2000, he joined Serie B side Cittadella, which he played 2 seasons.

Roma
On 28 June 2002, 2 days before the closure of 2001–02 fiscal year, he was surprisingly signed by Roma in exchange deal, signed a 3-year contract, to swap club with Simone Farina who both tagged for €2.4 million. Roma also bought back half of Farina's registration rights for €1.2million. That week Roma also swap backup players and even youth players with other teams with inflated price, and gained a "profit" of €55billion. Sturba was named one of the victim of doping administration by the media, which Roma suspected to use cross-trading (exchange player with same price and contract length) and inflated the price in order to increase the profit of selling player. In although they did not received real money of selling player, the acquire cost was to amortized proportionality during the player contract (usually multi-year), overall it still appeared a profit in the first year fiscal report, in although most of the nominal value of the registration rights of new signings, were far higher than the fair value. Thus like took drug to enhance the economic situation.

That led to an investigation by prosecutor of Rome for a suspected false accounting in 2004. But Roma was fined €60,000 on 30 October 2007 by Criminal Court of Rome for irregularity on youth players transfer only, as cross trading and inflating the price itself is not illegal, prosecutor failed to prove the purpose behind is illegal against the clubs.

Sturba was loaned to Serie B side Venezia on 31 August 2002, but in January 2003 loaned to league rival Salernitana. In 2003–04 season, he was loaned to Catania, also at Serie B, but the loan came early end in May 2004.

Sturba failed to play in the first half of the season as no club willing to loan him. In the second half of 2004–05 season, he joined Teramo where he joined Luigi Panarelli and Alberto Schettino, who also acquired by Roma in 2002.

Lucchese
In summer 2005, he joined Serie C1 side Lucchese and then retired.

References

External links
 

Italian footballers
Serie A players
Serie B players
Hellas Verona F.C. players
A.C.N. Siena 1904 players
S.S. Fidelis Andria 1928 players
U.S. Livorno 1915 players
A.S. Cittadella players
Venezia F.C. players
U.S. Salernitana 1919 players
Catania S.S.D. players
S.S. Teramo Calcio players
S.S.D. Lucchese 1905 players
Association football midfielders
Footballers from Rome
1972 births
Living people